Germanton is an unincorporated community and census-designated place (CDP) in Forsyth and Stokes counties in the U.S. state of North Carolina, primarily in Stokes County. As of the 2010 census it had a population of 827.

Germanton was the county seat of Stokes County prior to Forsyth County being created from southern Stokes. Before the creation of Forsyth County, Germanton was centrally located within the Stokes County limits.

Demographics

History
Germanton was established in 1790 and is the oldest community in Stokes County. The town's original  were part of a  tract that was granted to Jacob Lash by the Earl of Granville in 1762. The 23 acres were deeded from brothers Michael and Henry Frey. The town was named after an influx of Germanic immigrants, who had served as veterans of the American Revolution, were given incentives to settle the area. These settlers included both Germans who fought against the crown, and Hessians who had been loyal to the crown. American Revolutionary War Major Joseph Winston, later a U.S. congressman, was a famous Germanton resident with a plantation nearby.

Germanton is located near the older Moravian settlements of Bethabara and Bethania, which were part of the Wachovia Tract settlement. The etymology of the "Germanton" name is often mistakenly attributed to this proximity. While Wachovia was settled for religious reasons by people originally from what is today the Czech Republic, the settlers of the Germanton area were primarily Lutheran, originally from areas in what is today Germany, and settled the area for non-religious purposes. Early Stokes county settlers were the result of land incentives by the State in 1790 given as a reward to those Germanic people who had fought for Independence.

The use of German as a mother tongue died out by the 1850s.

Coal was mined in the Germanton area in the late 19th century but was of low quality.

The Germanton Methodist Church and Cemetery, Leak-Chaffin-Browder House, and St. Philip's Episcopal Church are listed on the National Register of Historic Places.

References

External links
"Visit Stokes County" web site
 Atlantic & Yadkin Railway

Census-designated places in Forsyth County, North Carolina
Census-designated places in Stokes County, North Carolina
Census-designated places in North Carolina
Populated places established in 1790
Czech communities in the United States
Czech-American culture